is a Japanese politician. He was first elected in 2010 House of Councillors election.  He previously served as a prefectural assembly member in Ōita Prefecture.

He ran for the Chairmanship of the Social Democratic Party (SDP) and defeated Tokyo City Toshima Ward Councilor Taiga Ishikawa, the first openly gay SDP elected politician, by a vote of 9,986 to 2,239 to win the party election on 14 October 2013.  He was inaugurated on 26 October 2013 as SDP party leader.

After a disappointing result in the 2016 upper house election, he announced his resignation as head of the party. He eventually retracted his resignation after the party urged for him not to resign. Yoshida concluded his term as president on 25 February 2018. Yoshida is planning to run again for elected office in the future.

On 24 December 2020, Yoshida submitted a notice of withdrawal to the Social Democratic Party and a notice of admission to the Constitutional Democratic Party (CDP), both of which were accepted on the same day.

External links 
 Tadatomo Yoshida on Twitter

References 

1956 births
Living people
Constitutional Democratic Party of Japan politicians
Social Democratic Party (Japan) politicians
Kyushu University alumni
People from Usuki, Ōita
Politicians from Ōita Prefecture